Wing twist is an aerodynamic feature added to aircraft wings to adjust lift distribution along the wing.

Often, the purpose of lift redistribution is to ensure that the wing tip is the last part of the wing surface to stall, for example when executing a roll or steep climb; it involves twisting the wingtip a small amount downwards in relation to the rest of the wing. This ensures that the effective angle of attack is always lower at the wingtip than at the root, meaning the root will stall before the tip. This is desirable because the aircraft's flight control surfaces are often located at the wingtip, and the variable stall characteristics of a twisted wing alert the pilot to the advancing stall while still allowing the control surfaces to remain effective, meaning the pilot can usually prevent the aircraft from stalling fully before control is completely lost.

Twist that decreases the local chord's incidence from root to tip is sometimes referred to as washout.  Twist that increases the local incidence from root to tip is less common and is called wash-in. The Grumman X-29 had strong wash-in to compensate for the additional root-first stalling promoted by the forward sweep.

Wing twist can also, rarely, refer to the deflection of the wing when it is made of insufficiently stiff materials; actuation of the flaps can, instead of deflecting air as intended, cause the wing itself to be deflected and is related to compressibility effects; this problem has mostly been eradicated however, with modern high-strength alloys and composites.

Wing twist is also observed in insects.

See also
Adaptive Compliant Wing
Angle of incidence
Sail twist
Unequal rotor lift distribution

References

External links
 Aerospaceweb- Wing Twist and Dihedral
  F-18 Hornet & Super Hornet Wing Twist
 Applied Aerodynamics: A Digital Textbook, Wing Design Parameters
The Sutter twist – an engineering story a wing twist named after the "father of the 747" Joe Sutter

Aerodynamics
Aircraft wing design